Lee Suk-hyeong (born July 29, 1978) is a South Korean actor. After making his debut with an indie film Today's Movie in 2014, he made a big impression on the minds of the audience through the indie films Jane of Dreams (2017) and Heart (2020).

Lee Seok-hyung was named as blue chip in the independent film industry after he won the 25th Bucheon International Fantastic Film Festival Korean Fantastic: Actor Award in the Feature section through his first feature film, Action Hero.

Lee also known for his in movie Jane of Dreams(2017), Action Hero (2020), Netflix and tvN drama series Hometown Cha-Cha-Cha (2021), and Disney plus and tvN drama seriesLink: Eat, Love, Kill (2022).

Early life 
Originally dreamed of becoming a cartoonist. Lee liked cartoons and had a creative spirit. Then one day he read a book about the life of a cartoonist, and it was much more difficult and than he had imagined. At that time, he gave up on his dream of becoming a cartoonist and became interested in films. He changed his dream to be a director. He got a chance to direct a movie. But after that, He wasn’t confident that He could take on the position of a director anymore. Then he became an actor.

Career 
Jane of Dreams was first screened at the Busan International Film Festival. Lee Seok-hyung as Byeong-wook. Byeong-wook, the leader of Pam, to which So-hyeon belongs, tries to maintain the precarious community with a tyrannical attitude, but cannot hide his anxious eyes that Pam members will hate him.

Lee enlisted in the military after filming Jane of Dreams. He filmed Heart as the main character 'Seongbeom', right after being discharged from the military. Heart was officially invited to the 'Korean Cinema Today-Vision' section of the 2019 Busan International Film Festival. He said he was filming when the tension was extremely high, a cross road between being an ordinary civilian or remain as an actor.

In October 2019, Actor Lee Seok-hyung signed an exclusive contract with Noon Company.

In 2021 Lee Seok-hyung won the 25th Bucheon International Fantastic Film Festival Korean Fantastic: Actor Award in the Feature section through his first feature film, Action Hero (Director Lee Jin-ho)

In Link: Eat, Love, Kill, Lee was cast as Cha Jin-ho, a junior chef of Eun Gye-hoon.

In Juvenile Justice, Lee was cast as Lee Nam-kyung, A boy who goes to court in a traffic accident case without a license for minors.

Filmography

Film

Television

Web series

Award

Notes

References

External links 
Lee Suk-hyeong at Noon Company 

Living people
1995 births
South Korean television personalities
South Korean male television actors
South Korean male film actors
21st-century South Korean male actors